A daydreamer is someone who daydreams.

Daydreamer may also refer to:

Songs 
 "Daydreamer" (David Cassidy song), 1973
 "Daydreamer" (Flux Pavilion song), 2012
 "Daydreamer", a song by Adele from 19
 "Daydreamer", a song by Menswear
 "11:00 AM (Daydreamer)", a song by 10 Years from Division
"Daydreamer", a song by Aurora from A Different Kind of Human (Step 2)

Albums 
 The Daydreamer (soundtrack), a soundtrack album from the 1966 film (see below)
 Daydreamer, a 2014 album by Harts
 Daydreamer, a 2005 album by Bassic
 Daydreamer, a 2011 mixtape by Kid Ink
 The Daydreamer, a 1966 album by Burl Ives

Other uses 
 The Daydreamer (film), a 1966 Rankin/Bass film
 The Daydreamer (1970 film), or Le Distrait, a French comedy directed by Pierre Richard
Daydreamer, a 2007 film starring Aaron Paul and Arielle Kebbel
 The Daydreamer (novel), 1994 novel by Ian McEwan
 Daydreamer (video game), a 2015 video game
 DAYDREAMER, a computer program modelling the human stream of thoughts

See also 
 Daydream (disambiguation)
 Daydreaming (disambiguation)
 "Runaway Daydreamer", a song by the English recording artist Sophie Ellis-Bextor for her fifth studio album Wanderlust (2014)